Rice goddess may refer to:
Dewi Sri in Sundanese, Javanese and Balinese culture.
Phosop in Thai culture (Lao Khosop, Khmer Po Ino Nogar).
Inari Ōkami in Japanese culture.